Antiguo Oriente is an annual peer-reviewed academic journal published by the Center of Studies of Ancient Near Eastern History (CEHAO) (Pontifical Catholic University of Argentina, Buenos Aires). It is one of the few scholarly journals in the Spanish-speaking world that focus on the ancient Near East (as opposed to journals focused on specific fields, such as Egyptology and biblical studies). 
 
The journal covers the history of societies of the ancient Near East and the Eastern Mediterranean from the Paleolithic through the Greco-Roman period, publishing articles and book reviews in English, French and Spanish.

Abstracting and indexing
The journal is abstracted and indexed in many bibliographic databases, including Scimago, Emerging Sources Citation Index (ESCI) and MIAR.

Editors-in-Chief
The following persons are or have been editors-in-chief:
 Roxana Flammini (2003-2011)
 Juan Manuel Tebes (2012-2018)
 Romina Della Casa (since 2018)

See also
Damqatum
Ancient Near East Monographs
List of history journals
List of theology journals

References

External links 

Academic journals published by universities of Argentina
Ancient Near East journals
Archaeology journals
Egyptology journals
Multilingual journals
Publications established in 2003
Annual journals